The 2016–17 Liga Alef season was the 8th season as third tier since its re-alignment in 2009 and the 75rd season of third-tier football in Israel.

The clubs which were ranked 1st in each division promoted to Liga Leumit. The clubs which were ranked between 2nd to 5th places in each division competed in a promotion play-offs, in which the winners, advanced to the final round against the 14th placed club in Liga Leumit.

At the bottom, the bottom two clubs in each division were all automatically relegated to Liga Bet, whilst the two clubs which were ranked in 14th place in each division, entered a promotion/relegation play-offs.

Changes from last season

Team changes
 Ironi Nesher and Maccabi Sha'arayim were promoted to Liga Leumit; Maccabi Kiryat Gat and Maccabi Yavne (to South division) were relegated from Liga Leumit.
 Maccabi Sektzia Ma'alot-Tarshiha and Ihud Bnei Majd al-Krum were relegated to Liga Bet from North division, F.C. Tzeirei Kafr Kanna, F.C. Haifa Robi Shapira and F.C. Tira were promoted to the North division from Liga Bet.
 Hapoel Morasha Ramat HaSharon and Bnei Eilat were relegated to Liga Bet from South division; Bnei Jaffa and F.C. Dimona were promoted to the South division from Liga Bet.

North Division

South Division

Promotion play-offs

First round
Second and third placed clubs played single match at home against the fourth and fifth placed clubs in their respective regional division.

Second round
The winners of the first round played single match at home of the higher ranked club (from each regional division).

Third round

Fourth round - promotion/relegation play-offs

Hapoel Nazareth Illit won 3–2 on aggregate and remained in Liga Leumit. F.C. Kafr Qasim remained in Liga Alef.

Relegation play-offs

North play-off

South play-off

References
Liga Alef North 2016/2017 The Israel Football Association 
Liga Alef South 2016/2017 The Israel Football Association 

3
Liga Alef seasons
Israel Liga Alef